Tirathaba leucotephras is a species of moth of the family Pyralidae. It was described by Edward Meyrick in 1936. It is found in Malaysia.

References 

Tirathabini
Moths described in 1936